is a city located in Kumamoto Prefecture, Japan. The city was founded on April 1, 1954. As of the October 3, 2005 merger (but with 2008 population estimates), the city has an estimated population of 70,530 and a population density of 462 persons per km². The total area is 152.55 km².

On October 3, 2005, the towns of Taimei, Tensui and Yokoshima (all from Tamana District) were merged into Tamana.

Geography

Climate
Tamana has a humid subtropical climate (Köppen climate classification Cfa) with hot, humid summers and cool winters. There is significant precipitation throughout the year, especially during June and July.

Demographics
Per Japanese census data, the population of Tamana in 2020 is 64,292 people. Tamana has been conducting censuses since 1960.

Notable people from Tamana, Kumamoto
 Shizo Kanakuri (1891–1983), Japanese marathon runner and one of the early leaders of track and field athletics in Japan
 Katsuhiro Ueo (born 1972), Japanese professional drifting driver 
 Yoshihiro Tajiri (born 1970),  Japanese professional wrestler and promoter
 Hayato Mizowaki (born 1994), Japanese professional baseball infielder for the Chunichi Dragons in Japan's Nippon Professional Baseball.
 Tenkaihō Takayuki (born 1984), retired sumo wrestler
 Kenichi Matsuoka (born 1982), professional Japanese baseball player (Tokyo Yakult Swallows, pitcher)
 Makoto Izubuchi (born 1974),  Japanese comedian, professional wrestler and tarento ("talent")

References

External links

 Tamana City official website 

Cities in Kumamoto Prefecture